Microdrillia optima  is a species of sea snail, a marine gastropod mollusk in the family Borsoniidae.

Description

Distribution
This marine species occurs in the Zanzibar Channel.

References

 Thiele, J. 1925. Gastropoda der Deutschen Tiefsee-Expedition, 1898–1899. II Wiss. Ergebn. dt. Tiefsee Exped. 'Valdivia' 17(2) 36–382.

External links
 
  Bouchet P., Kantor Yu.I., Sysoev A. & Puillandre N. (2011) A new operational classification of the Conoidea. Journal of Molluscan Studies 77: 273–308

optima
Gastropods described in 1925